The team jumping at the 1960 Summer Olympics took place on 11 September, at the Stadio Olimpico. The event was open to men and women. It was the 10th appearance of the event.

Background

There were two separate jumping competitions for individual and team medals, the first time this had occurred since 1920. 54 riders from 18 countries competed in the team event, though only 1 out of every 3 teams finished the competition.

Competition format

The course was 800 metres long with 14 obstacles, including one double jump and one triple jump for a total of 17 jumps. The time limit was 1 minute and 59 seconds; every second over the limit incurred a 0.25 point penalty. There were also penalties for obstacle faults. Each horse and rider pair completed the course twice, with the two scores summed to give a final total; the three scores for the team members were summed to give a team score for ranking. All three team members needed to finish for the team to have a valid score.

Results

18 teams of 3 riders competed.

References

Equestrian at the 1960 Summer Olympics